This is a list of satellites operated by SES S.A.

AMC fleet Gunter's Space Page Accessed 26 July 2021 
The AMC fleet was originally operated by GE Americom, acquired by SES Global in 2001. Americom was also operating the older Satcom fleet, whose last operating spacecraft were fully retired in the early 2000s.

Astra fleet

NSS fleet 
This fleet came from the acquisition of New Skies Satellites in 2005, which itself had inherited 5 satellites from Intelsat in 1998.

SES fleet

O3b fleet 
The O3b fleet was initially owned and operated by O3b Networks, which became a wholly owned subsidiary of SES S.A. in 2016 Orbiting in Medium Earth orbit (MEO), the first generation satellites are sometimes referred to as "O3b MEO" to more clearly distinguish them from the forthcoming second generation O3b mPOWER constellation (to launch 2022–2024, and start service in Q3 2023)..

Third-party satellites 
SES also manages some transponders on a few third-party satellites under joint operating agreements.

See also

 SES S.A.
 SES Americom
 SES Astra
 SES Sirius
 List of broadcast satellites

References